The Weka Pass Railway is a New Zealand heritage railway based in Waipara, North Canterbury. It is operated on a 12.8 km length of the former Waiau Branch railway between Waipara and Waikari. The railway is operated by an incorporated society whose members come from all walks of life and are largely resident in the city of Christchurch, 60 km to the south. The railway began carrying passengers in 1984 and is now well established locally and nationally.

History

Beginnings

The first stage of the Waiau Branch line inland through the Weka Pass to Waikari was completed in 1882. This area is noted for its scenery and the railway passes through many large cuttings, around tight curves and on steep gradients (max 1 in 47). When originally built the line was expected to be part of the South Island Main Trunk Railway north of the city of Christchurch. Further sections of the line through Hawarden, Medbury, Balmoral, Pahau, Culverden, Achray, Rotherham and Waiau were constructed in subsequent years. The line was officially opened to Medbury in 1884 and to Culverden in 1886 but the final section to Waiau was not completed until 1919. In the 1920s the decision was made to take the Main North Line on a coastal route north out of Waipara. The Main North Line, which involved major earthworks and many engineering difficulties, was not completed until 1945.

The Waiau Branch suffered the fate of many rural branch lines in later years as increasing competition from road transport saw a decline in traffic carried. For many years the railways were protected from this competition by mileage limits; as these were gradually increased, more and more branches were closed. The branch had a short reprieve in its twilight years when large amounts of logs were carried from the Balmoral forest. Closure occurred on 15 January 1978.

Formation
A public meeting at Waipara in August 1982 saw a steering committee established to investigate the Weka Pass Railway proposal. There had been interest from a number of people in preserving part of this old branch line particularly in the scenic Weka Pass. The impetus came from local Waipara people who saw the tourist potential, and railway enthusiasts, many drawn from the Ferrymead Railway. The Society was formally established in November that year. The new group began negotiating with NZ Railways and other parties to purchase track, locomotives, rolling stock and other facilities. In May 1983, the first major public event was held. The "Mayfair Festival" was held and featured the Canterbury Railway Societys Manning Wardle No. 1841 of 1914, and Fowler No. 16246 of 1924 from the Canterbury Steam Preservation Society, along with rakes of LA and LC "high-side" wagons, full of passengers. Shuttles ran from the old Waipara yard to the 3 km straight.

In July 1983, the railway agreed with the New Zealand Railways Corporation to lease the line between Waipara and the south bank of the Hurunui River. Public running commenced on 4 June 1984, and travelled from McCaskeys Crossing to Herberts Crossing (and stopped for picnics at Frog Rock along the way). The WPR purchased the leased section of the line on 3 September 1984, and the final payment was made on 28 August 1990. On 30 September 1984, running on the line ceased due to legal complications about the transfer of the ownership. The railway was later granted permission to operate trains on under their own name on the line, a public running recommenced on 17 March 1985.

Following the closure the Waiau line, all of the track remained in place except for the removal of a level crossing at Waikari where the road crossed State Highway 7 due to Transit New Zealand and the National Roads Board refusing for the crossing to be reinstalled. Because of this, in September 1988 the WPR agreed to lift the line between Waikari and the south bank of the Hurunui River, and section was finally lifted by July 1991.

Track and turntables

Track
The Weka Pass Railway operates 12.8 km of the former Waiau Branchline between Waipara and its terminus at Waikari.

Not long after trains commenced running to Waikari, the railway suffered a major setback in 1986 when heavy rain damaged the line in a number of places. During this time, it was decided that the line wasn't in good condition, and it would need extensive repairs, and earthworks in some portion of line. By April 1987 trains were running to the 5.5 km peg. Due to a slump near Antils Hut found in September 1987, trains were once again restricted. After repairs were made, trains recommenced running to the area on 28 January 1988. During this time, the section of track between the old Waipara yard and Glenmark Station were realigned. In the same year, work started in Waikari with the ripping up of track.

On 3 June 1990, trains started operating to Gate No. 2. Trains then started operating to Frog Rock in June 1991, and to Herberts Crossing on 23 August 1992. The line later reached Timpendean, but due to the lack of a suitable picnic area, trains were only allowed to run to Herberts Crossing. On 11 September 1999 was marked as a historic day for the WPR, as it was the day for opening of the line to Waikari, and also the official opening day of the WPR. A "members train" was hauled by DGs 770 and 791 and travelled all the way to Waikari, and after dropping the members off at the platform, the train was propelled back, where the DGs were placed into the turntable road, and F 163 sat in the loop with the "members train". A "special guest train", which was hauled by A 428, followed soon after. WD 357 sat at the end of the line at the stop block. In 2001, a new turn-out was installed in the yard in Waipara.

Turntables
The railway has a turntable at both Glenmark and Waikari. A 55-foot turntable was installed in Waikari on 3 October 2002, and was recommissioned on 31 August 2003. A special train ran from Christchurch hauled by DCP 4761, as well as another train, which was hauled by A 428 and composed of the railway's own carriages. The turntable was found in a scrap heap in Middleton Yard (in Christchurch), and was purchased by the railway in the mid-1990s. A 62-foot turntable was installed in Glenmark (Waipara). It took 14 months for the turntable to be restored and installed, and was reopened on 12 July 2009. There were issues with the installation with the turntable, as the land was privately owned at the time. This now enables the locomotives to be turned to face the correct way, instead of running tender-leading on the return journey to Glenmark from Waikari. In 2010, the railway won the "KiwiRail Network Infrastructure Improvement Undertaken by a Heritage Railway award" for the restorations of the two turntables.

Buildings

Stations

Glenmark Station

The ex-Mina Railway Station was built in 1910, and served many passenger trains along the Main North Line, and had been extensively refurbished. By 1979, a new concrete front was needed to support the platform. In October 1980, the railway station became an unattended flag station, and was closed to all traffic. A private resident and his family, who was living in Cheviot at the time, raised funds and made generous donations to preserve and transport the station to Waipara. In 1986 disassemble of the station commenced, and the station arrived in its current site in 1987. The building was shifted in two sections, and after rejoining the two sections, a new roof was constructed, and new foundations made. A verandah was also fitted, and the station has been in use since April 1988. To avoid confusion, the station was renamed as Glenmark Station, to avoid confusion of the current Waipara Station on the Main North Line.

Waikari Station
The ex-Hundalee Station was built in 1939, and is a standard class A station (which were designed by George Troup). The station also served many passenger trains along the Main North Line. The building was purchased by the WPR, and was transported to Waikari on 29 October 1991. By July 1992, the station was fully restored, and served its first train in Waikari on 11 September 1999.

In 1995, the railway received an award from the Rail Heritage Trust of New Zealand for the restoration of the two stations.

Locomotive depot and workshop
In the mid 1980s, a two-road workshop was built in the old Waipara rail yard. The depot was later extended to a three-road depot in 2005, and a pit was installed.

Carriage Shed
Between 2005 and 2006, a two-road carriage shed was built, and was fitted with roller doors. It houses the WPRs carriage fleet, Wickham Track Inspection Car and one or both DGs. During mid-2012, the shed was fitted with four swinging doors.

Gate Huts
Because of the railway running through private farmland, Gate Keepers are assigned to Gates No. 1 and 2. Because of this, a hut is allocated to both gates.

During the mid to late 1980s, phone-booth huts were built. But because of the small size of them, the ex-pump-house from the former Kaiapoi rail yard was transported to Gate No. 1, and the ex-Hawarden Gangers hut was transported to Gate No. 2, to replace the phone-booth like-huts. On 8 July 2004, two new brand new huts (which were built in the WPRs yard in Waipara) replaced the second-hand huts (which have since been demolished). The new huts have been named after two late members respectfully.

Operations and membership
The Railway is fully operated by volunteers. These volunteers come from all walks of life and have diverse and varied interests within the railway. Trackwork enthusiasts can lead a hand on a Wednesday work train, however the majority of work occurs on Saturdays where activities range from shunting movements to engineering. Complimentary training is offered in both correspondence form, and through one-on-one and group lecturing. No fees occur (except for the issue of steam locomotive firemans and drivers certificate, assessed by an external examiner) for these services.

On Running days, the following positions are available:

Train Control
On the Weka Pass Railway, Tablet Control and Track Authority Control is used to ensure safety of trains between the Glenmark and Waikari station limits. The Train Control Officer (TCO) is responsible for issuing track authorities and for ensuring safe movements on the single line. They communicate with train operating staff members, including train drivers, gate keepers and the Waikari stationmaster in person and via radio.

Waikari Stationmaster
The Waikari Stationmaster is responsible for driving the track inspection vehicle from Glenmark station to Waikari station at the start of a running day. Upon arrival at Waikari, they sell tickets to any passengers, give clearance to trains to enter Waikari station limits, and assist with shunting manoeuvres. At the end of a running day, they drive the track inspection vehicle from Waikari back to Glenmark.

Guard
The Guard is responsible for the running of trains. Their duties include but are not limited to carrying out terminal/intermediate brake tests, clipping passenger tickets, and managing crowds during photo-runs. They are also able to engage in conversation with passengers, or simply enjoy the views from the guards van or AT viewing cars. Above all, they are responsible for the safe running of each train service.

Assistant Guard(s)
Assistant Guards assist the Guard in completing their duties. Usually, the guard will assign them to either collect tickets or perform a passenger headcount, while the guard will perform the remaining task.

Locomotive Driver
The Locomotive Drivers duty is to prepare and manoeuvre the locomotive. They are responsible for ensuring that all necessary steps are taken in the preparation of the locomotive and are in charge of operating the locomotive. As the line is steeply graded, they must be very careful to ensure that the locomotive's wheels do not slip, and must ensure that the fireman has maintained sufficient water level in the boiler before cresting gradients, in order to prevent crown sheet damage and fusible plug fusion. Sustainable braking must also be performed when travelling down grades.

Locomotive Assistant/Fireman
The Locomotive Assistant/Fireman's duty is to assist the driver with the safe and efficient operation of the locomotive. The fireman performs controlled firing to raise sufficient steam pressure for the drivers usage on a steam locomotive. The fireman is also responsible for maintaining sufficient water level in the boiler and performing shunting where required. The Locomotive Assistant on a diesel locomotive can be thought of as a first officer, assisting the driver and watching the road ahead, as well as performing shunting where required. As firemen and locomotive assistants gain experience, drivers will begin teaching them to drive the locomotive.

Locomotive Trainee
They ride with the engine crews in the cab and are able to practice firing techniques, often on the afternoon train on a standard running day. Qualified Firemen/Locomotive Assistants and Drivers supervise these members and give tips and advice to assist the trainee. The trainees are also trained to prepare appliances such as the Detroit Lubricator and the Westinghouse Brake Pumps.

PPA
During times of high demand, PPA (Preparing and Putting Away) assistants are rostered to help out with operations. A PPA assistant usually has the skill and experience level of a locomotive trainee. They are rostered to allow duties to be completed faster, allowing loco crew shifts to be completed within 10 hours.

Gate Keeper

When the Weka Pass Railway society was formed, much of the original railway formation was already divided onto private land. As a result, the modern day railway passes over several farms. Gate Keepers are responsible for ensuring that livestock does not move from paddock to paddock, and they must report to train control if stock are preventing a gate from being open.

Locomotives and rolling stock
The railway presently owns four locomotives, all formerly owned by the New Zealand Government Railways, and a large fleet of ex-NZR rolling stock.

NZR steam locomotives

NZR diesel locomotives

Carriages

Viewing cars

Vans

Wagons

Cranes

Track inspection cars

Gallery

References

External links
 

Rail transport in Canterbury, New Zealand
Hurunui District
Tourist attractions in Canterbury, New Zealand